Vladimir Sergeyevich Ponomaryov (born 22 April 1987) is a Russian former professional football player.

Club career
He played for the main squad of FC Rostov in the Russian Cup.

On 29 January 2015, Ponomaryov moved to FC Tyumen.

References

External links
 
 

1987 births
Sportspeople from Omsk
Living people
Russian footballers
Association football defenders
FC Dynamo Moscow reserves players
FC Rostov players
FC Volgar Astrakhan players
FC Krasnodar players
FC Sodovik Sterlitamak players
FC Mordovia Saransk players
FC Torpedo Moscow players
Russian Premier League players
FC Luch Vladivostok players
FC Tyumen players
FC Tosno players
FC Solyaris Moscow players
FC Baltika Kaliningrad players
FC Dynamo Bryansk players
FC Kolkheti-1913 Poti players
FC Irtysh Omsk players
Russian expatriate footballers
Expatriate footballers in Georgia (country)
FC Rotor Volgograd players
FC Nizhny Novgorod (2015) players